Pablo Cruz Guerrero (born 2 February 1984) is a Mexican actor.

Filmography

Film roles

Television roles

References

External links 

1984 births
Mexican male telenovela actors
Living people
21st-century Mexican male actors
Mexican male television actors
Mexican male film actors
Male actors from Mexico City